This is a list of fellows of the Royal Society elected in 1722.

Fellows
 Thomas Bacon (?1664–1736)
 Charles Beauclerk, 1st Duke of St Albans (1670–1726)
 Philip Julius Borneman (fl.1722–1726)
 Richard Boyle, 3rd Earl of Burlington and 4th Earl of Cork (1695–1753)
 Ambrose Dickens (c. 1687–1747)
 Charles Douglas, 3rd Duke of Queensberry (1698–1778)
 Samuel Harris (1682–1733)
 Robert Hucks (d. 1745)
 Richard Lucas (c. 1693–?1747)
 Thomas Miles (d. 1767)
 Richard Molesworth, 3rd Viscount Molesworth (1680–1758)
 Giambattista Morgagni (1682–1771)
 Samuel Morland (d. 1734)
 William Musgrave (c. 1696–1724)
 George Parker, 2nd Earl of Macclesfield (c. 1697–1764)
 William Paston, 2nd Earl of Yarmouth (1652–1732)
 William Sloane (1696–1767)
 Charles Taylor (c. 1693–1766)
 Abraham Vater (1684–1751)
 Talbot Yelverton, Earl of Sussex (1690–1731)

References

1722
1722 in science
1722 in England